The Lady Hughes Affair was a 1784 diplomatic incident between Britain and China. On November 24, 1784, a gunner from a British ship in Canton harbor fired a salute for a Danish ship, which ended up killing two Chinese men in a nearby boat. In response, Chinese officials detained the Lady Hughes until the British handed over the gunner. The gunner was then executed by strangulation, an outcome that the British were very displeased with.

The British criticized the decision, saying that justice was too harsh and the gunner lacked due process. These criticisms ultimately helped contribute to the ultimate imposition of extraterritoriality regimes in China.

Although the British claimed that the deaths of the two Chinese were accidental, this has been questioned by subsequent scholarship. Under English law, for a homicide to be considered accidental it needed to occur as part of a lawful act, and the British were aware that firing salutes was a felony.

References 

1784 in China
Maritime incidents in 1784